Mount Wrangell, in Ahtna K’ełt’aeni or K’ełedi when erupting, is a massive shield volcano located in Wrangell-St. Elias National Park and Preserve in southeastern Alaska, United States.

Description
Modern Mount Wrangell, built upon the remnants of a mid-Pleistocene volcano, has an eruptive history spanning from 750,000 years ago to minor phreatic eruptions in 1884. The shield volcano features an ice-filled caldera  in diameter at the top of Wrangell's broad summit. The caldera was apparently formed by subsidence rather than large explosive eruptions. The caldera is in turn rimmed by three small craters, which often display fumarolic activity with steam plumes that can sometimes be seen from a distance.

Mount Wrangell is almost entirely covered by an icefield that persists from year to year. The largest glacier on Wrangell is Nabesna Glacier, the source of the Nabesna River. Other glaciers on Mount Wrangell include Cheshnina Glacier, Chetaslina Glacier, Chichokna Glacier, Dadina Glacier and Copper Glacier.

Wrangell was the first high volcano in the Wrangell range to be climbed.  Its summit can be visited by ski-equipped airplane.

Naming
Mount Wrangell [rang-guhl] was named after Russian Admiral Ferdinand von Wrangel (or Wrangell), governor of Russian America from 1830 to 1836. The Ahtna people call it K'elt'aeni, "the one who controls the weather," with the alternate name Uk'eledi, "the one with smoke on it" when it is active. On some pre-1900 maps Wrangell was labeled as Mount Tillman.

Volcanic activity

Wrangell is the only volcano in the Wrangell Volcanic Field to have had historically recorded eruptions, generally in the form of small steam and ash explosions. Reports of activity have been recorded in 1784 and 1884–85. The 1784 eruption and another stated to have occurred in 1760 are disputed.  The 1884-85 eruption was reported by local prospector Jon Bremner. An 1890 report mention a visible glow. Wrangell also occasionally emits ash, which can be seen coating the summit snow. The bulk of the mountain was built by large lava flows from 600,000 to 200,000 years ago. The summit caldera is believed to have collapsed within the last 200,000 years, and may have collapsed 50,000 years ago. Mount Zanetti is about 25,000 years old.

The amount of geothermal heat being emitted by Wrangell increased from the 1950s to the 1980s, raising the possibility of a future eruption. The heat flux was high enough to melt ice around the craters and create ice caves and small lakes in the north crater, with about 100 million cubic meters of ice melted by 1986. Since then heat output has decreased and ice has reaccumulated.

See also

List of mountain peaks of North America
List of mountain peaks of the United States
List of mountain peaks of Alaska
List of Ultras of the United States
List of volcanoes in the United States

References

Bibliography

External links

Landforms of Copper River Census Area, Alaska
Shield volcanoes of the United States
Active volcanoes
Pleistocene shield volcanoes
Mountains of Alaska
Volcanoes of Alaska
Wrangell–St. Elias National Park and Preserve
Mount Wrangell
Mountains of Unorganized Borough, Alaska
Volcanoes of Unorganized Borough, Alaska
Cinder cones of the United States
Polygenetic shield volcanoes